Seoul Metropolitan City Route 31 is an urban road located in Seoul, South Korea.

Stopovers

 Seoul
 Seocho District - Yongsan District - Jung District - Jongno District

List of Facilities 
IS: Intersection, IC: Interchange

References

Roads in Seoul